Douglas Cartland may refer to:

 Douglas Cartland (Silent Hill), a video game character
 Douglas Cartland (table tennis) (1914–?), American table tennis player